Synchiropus delandi, the Deland's dragonet, is a species of fish in the family Callionymidae, the dragonets. It is found in the Western Central Pacific from Philippines to Indonesia.

Etymology
The fish is named in honor of Judson de Land of Philadelphia, Pennsylvania, a physician, to whom Fowler was “indebted for American fishes”.

References

delandi
Fish of the Pacific Ocean
Fish of East Asia
Taxa named by Henry Weed Fowler
Fish described in 1943